Saint Sophia may refer to

 Saint Sophia of Milan, feast day 17 September
Saint Sophia of Rome, martyr, feast day 15 May
 Saint Sophia of Sortino (Sicily), martyr, feast day 23 September
 Saint Sofia of Suzdal (died 1542), see Solomonia Yuryevna Saburova
 Saint Sophia of Slutsk (died 1612), see Sophia Olelkovich Radziwill
 Sancta Sophia College

See also 

 Hagia Sophia (disambiguation)
 Sophia (disambiguation)
 Santa Sofia (disambiguation)
 Saint Sophia Cathedral (disambiguation)